On 4 August 2021, two passenger trains collided at Milavče in the Czech Republic. Three people were killed and 67 were injured.

Background 
Train collisions in the Czech Republic are relatively frequent by European standards because of outdated safety systems. After a deadly collision in 2020, the Czech government announced a modernization programme. As of 2021 the European Train Control System (ETCS) is installed on only  of rail; by 2025 this is planned to be expanded to all main lines.

Accident
Two passenger trains collided head-on at Milavče, Plzeň Region, Czech Republic at 08:06 local time (06:06 UTC). One of the trains was a České dráhy local service from Plzeň to Domažlice, with ČD Class 844 RegioShark diesel multiple unit 844 006. The other was an international service from Munich, Germany to Prague, Czech Republic, operated by České dráhy in the Czech Republic and by Die Länderbahn in Germany. The train was hauled by Class 223 diesel locomotive 223 066.

Three people were killed, and 67 were injured, five seriously. Those killed were both drivers and a female passenger, all Czech citizens. One person was reported missing.

Rescuers from Germany assisted their Czech colleagues. Four helicopters transported the injured to hospitals in Plzeň. Ten less severely injured patients were transported to hospitals in Germany. Damages were estimated as in excess of Kč 100,000,000 (about 3.9 million Euro or 4.6 million US$).

Investigations
The Rail Safety Inspection Office (RSIO ) opened an investigation into the accident. The investigation is expected to take several months. A criminal investigation was also opened as negligence was suspected to be one of the causes of the accident. České dráhy likewise opened an investigation into the accident.

Czech transport minister Karel Havlíček said that the international train had passed a stop signal (SPAD). Inspector General of the RSIO Jan Kučera said that it was not known whether the SPAD was a result of a technical defect with the train or driver error.

References

2021 disasters in the Czech Republic
2021 in the Czech Republic
Accidents and incidents involving České dráhy
August 2021 events in Europe
August 2021 events in the Czech Republic
Domažlice District
Train collisions in the Czech Republic
Railway accidents in 2021
Railway accidents involving a signal passed at danger